Abu al-Qasim al-Habib Neishaburi was a Persian physician from Khorasan who lived before 1750CE. His name indicates he was from Nishapur.

He is known to have written two Arabic treatises on Prophetic medicine. One is in a unique copy now at The National Library of Medicine, copied in 1792CE, and the other is preserved in a unique copy now in Los Angeles that was copied in 1750CE.

Therefore, the author must have been active before 1750CE. Since he cites amongst his authorities Ibn Shahin, who composed his major work in 1453CE, we know that Naysaburi must have been active after the mid-15th century.

Nothing else is known about this author.

See also

List of Iranian scientists

Sources
For the manuscript now in Los Angeles, see A.Z. Iskandar, A Descriptive List of Arabic Manuscripts on Medicine and Science at the University of California, Los Angeles (Leiden: Brill, 1984), p. 82.

18th-century Iranian physicians
Year of birth unknown
Year of death unknown
Physicians from Nishapur